Josiel Ortega Arruda (born 13 March 1999), simply known as Josiel, is a Brazilian professional footballer who plays for Ponte Preta, on loan from Cuiabá. Mainly a forward, he can also play as a right back.

Club career
Josiel joined Nacional-SP's youth setup in 2018, after starting out at Mixto, but was subsequently loaned to Grêmio. He returned to NAC in January 2019, but joined Cuiabá in February.

Josiel made his first team debut for Cuiabá on 7 August 2019, coming on as a second-half substitute in a 2–1 away win against Iporá, for the year's Copa Verde. He then featured rarely for the main squad before moving on loan to Azuriz in September 2020.

Josiel returned to the Dourado in December 2020, and started to feature more regularly with the club in the 2021 Campeonato Mato-Grossense.

Career statistics

Honours
Cuiabá
Copa Verde: 2019
Campeonato Mato-Grossense: 2021

Azuriz
Campeonato Paranaense 2ª Divisão: 2020

References

External links

1999 births
Living people
People from Várzea Grande, Mato Grosso
Brazilian footballers
Association football forwards
Campeonato Brasileiro Série B players
Cuiabá Esporte Clube players
Associação Atlética Ponte Preta players
Azuriz Futebol Clube players
Sportspeople from Mato Grosso